Gerard Bordas Bahamontes (born 11 September 1981 in Manresa, Barcelona, Catalonia) is a Spanish former professional footballer who played as a winger or a forward.

External links

1981 births
Living people
Footballers from Manresa
Spanish footballers
Association football wingers
Association football forwards
La Liga players
Segunda División players
Segunda División B players
Tercera División players
CE Manresa players
Terrassa FC footballers
CF Gavà players
Gimnàstic de Tarragona footballers
Lorca Deportiva CF footballers
Villarreal CF B players
Villarreal CF players
Girona FC players